Miroslav Giuchici (born 18 April 1954) is a Romanian former footballer who played as a midfielder. His son who was also named Miroslav Giuchici was also a footballer. After he ended his playing career, Giuchici started his own football academy, which was called Srbianka Giuchici Timișoara. He wrote a book which was released in 2018 called Viață și fotbal (Life and football).

Honours
Politehnica Timișoara
Divizia B: 1983–84, 1986–87
Cupa României runner-up: 1982–83

Notes

References

1954 births
Living people
Romanian people of Serbian descent
Romanian footballers
Association football midfielders
Liga I players
Liga II players
Liga III players
FC CFR Timișoara players
FC Politehnica Timișoara players
CSM Jiul Petroșani players
Romanian writers
21st-century Romanian writers
Romanian male writers